Françoise de Panafieu (born 12 December 1948) is a French politician, member of The Republicans (LR) party and mayor of the 17th arrondissement of Paris between 2001 and 2008.

Political career
De Panafieu was a member of the French Cabinet as Minister of Tourism in 1995 and she has been a member of the National Assembly for Paris since 2002. She unsuccessfully ran for Paris mayorship in the 2008 municipal elections against Bertrand Delanoë, losing by almost 20 points.

Under the leadership of Anne Levade, De Panafieu was part of the organizing committee of the Republicans’ first-ever primary to select the party’s candidate for the 2017 presidential election.

Other activities
 Rencontres d'Arles, Member of the Board of Directors.

References

External links 

  Françoise de Panafieu page on the Assemblée nationale
  Page of Françoise de Panafieu on www.nosdeputes.fr

1948 births
Living people
People from Moyeuvre-Grande
Rally for the Republic politicians
Union for a Popular Movement politicians
The Republicans (France) politicians
Government ministers of France
Mayors of arrondissements of Paris
Councillors of Paris
Paris Nanterre University alumni
Women members of the National Assembly (France)
Women mayors of places in France
Deputies of the 12th National Assembly of the French Fifth Republic
Deputies of the 13th National Assembly of the French Fifth Republic
21st-century French women politicians
Women government ministers of France
Politicians from Grand Est